Nabil Abidallah (born 5 August 1982 in Amsterdam) is a former Dutch professional footballer of Moroccan origin.

Club career
Born in Amsterdam, Abidallah's career started at Ajax in 1999, from where he moved to Ipswich Town, where he only played twice in the league both of which coming on as a substitute against Everton and Bradford City, in 2001. He stayed with Town for four years making a total of six appearances, before being given a free transfer to Northampton Town. He also played for Heybridge Swifts and Clacton Town, before returning to the Netherlands to play for amateur side Amsterdamsche in 2005. From 2006 on he played at Aalsmeer.

In 2008, he joined Swedish side Fässbergs before joining Italian Torres in 2009.

Personal life
In May 2006 Abidallah was arrested for burglary, after breaking into his former house which he had to leave after failing to pay his rent.

References

External links
 Statistics at soccerbase.com
 Profile at dutchplayers.nl
 Netherlands youth at OnsOranje

1982 births
Living people
Footballers from Amsterdam
Dutch sportspeople of Moroccan descent
Dutch footballers
Jong Ajax players
Dutch expatriate footballers
Dutch expatriate sportspeople in Sweden
Dutch expatriate sportspeople in England
Expatriate footballers in England
Expatriate footballers in Sweden
Ipswich Town F.C. players
Northampton Town F.C. players
Heybridge Swifts F.C. players
Amsterdamsche FC players
A.F.C. Sudbury players
Swindon Supermarine F.C. players
Premier League players
English Football League players
Association football midfielders
Netherlands youth international footballers